Sedkaoui is a surname. It may refer to:

Akram Sedkaoui, French singer, contestant in season 3 of The Voice: la plus belle voix (France)
Atef Sedkaoui, French singer, contestant in season 1 of The Voice: la plus belle voix (France)
Kaci Sedkaoui (born 1986), Algerian football player